Horses' Collars is a 1935 short subject directed by Clyde Bruckman and starring American slapstick comedy team The Three Stooges (Moe Howard, Larry Fine and Jerry Howard).
 It is the fifth entry in the series released by Columbia Pictures starring the comedians, who released 190 short films for the studio between 1934 and 1959.

Plot
The Stooges are detectives in the Old West. They have been sent out to recover an IOU from Double Deal Decker (Fred Kohler), a ruthless killer who plans to take possession of a ranch that is rightfully owned by Nell (Dorothy Kent). After an unsuccessful attempt at a saloon, the Stooges head to Decker's hideout, where they find an IOU, and Curly manages to defeat the killers.

Production notes
Horses' Collars was filmed on November 23–27, 1934. The opening theme song is titled "At the Races," composed by Louis Silvers.
Curly has a violent reaction to the sight of a live mouse at any time, going into a fit while demanding, "Moe! Larry! The Cheese!". The only cure is for someone to feed him cheese, with Curly telling them which kind. The reason for this is explained by Moe & Larry, stating that Curly's father was a rat. The kind of cheeses that Curly calls for are roquefort, camembert, and limburger; all three of which are known to have highly pungent aromas.

An external stimulus — as with Curly spotting the mouse — that causes him to go bonkers was also used as a plot element in Punch Drunks, Grips, Grunts and Groans, and Tassels in the Air.

Horses' Collars was the first of 17 Western-themed films the Stooges would make. It is also the first short where the Stooges sing "You'll Never Know What Tears Are" in barbershop music style. This song would make an appearance in future shorts Half-Shot Shooters and A Ducking They Did Go.

The casting of Kohler, who played the villain in countless actual westerns, gave the film some added authenticity.

References

External links 

Horses' Collars at threestooges.net

1935 films
The Three Stooges films
American black-and-white films
Films directed by Clyde Bruckman
1930s Western (genre) comedy films
Columbia Pictures short films
American Western (genre) comedy films
American slapstick comedy films
1935 comedy films
1930s English-language films
1930s American films